"Run to Paradise" is a single by Australian hard rock group The Choirboys which reached No. 3 on the Australian Kent Music Report Singles Chart in December 1987. The related Big Bad Noise album peaked at No. 5, and was the twenty-first highest-selling album of 1988 in Australia. In New Zealand, "Run to Paradise" attained No. 13 on the RIANZ Singles Chart. Released in the United States in 1989, it appeared on the Billboard Hot 100 and Mainstream Rock charts. The song was re-worked for a 2004 release credited to Nick Skitz vs. Choirboys and reached No. 16 on the ARIA Singles Chart.

In January 2018, as part of Triple M's "Ozzest 100", the 'most Australian' songs of all time, "Run to Paradise" was ranked number 24.

Background
Choirboys signed with Mushroom Records and released "Fireworks" in May 1986, they also opened for Deep Purple on their tour of Australia. Brad Carr left the group to be replaced on lead guitar by Brett Williams (ex-Brakes) as they supported Bon Jovi's tour in 1987. They recorded their second album Big Bad Noise with producers Peter Blyton (The Radiators, Machinations) and Brian McGee (The Rolling Stones, Cyndi Lauper). The next single "Run to Paradise" reached No. 3 in December. In New Zealand, it attained No. 13 on the RIANZ Singles Chart. Released in the United States, it appeared on the Billboard Hot 100 and peaked at No. 33 on the Mainstream Rock chart in 1989. Big Bad Noise peaked at No. 5 on the Kent Music Report Albums Chart in April 1988, and was the twenty-first highest-selling album for the year in Australia. Other singles from the album included "Boys Will Be Boys" and "Struggle Town" reaching No. 14 and No. 34 respectively.

The song returned to the Australian singles charts in Australia in July 2004 when dance producer Nick Skitz asked Gable to sing "Run to Paradise" on a dance reworking. The song, billed as "Nick Skitz vs. Choirboys", debuted in the top 20 of the Australian singles charts and stayed in the charts for six weeks before leaving the top 50.

Jay Parrino performed the song during the semi-finals of Australia's Got Talent 2009. With his 'one-man-band' act he recorded live drums into a loop station then played guitar and sang over the top. This arrangement has a swinging 12/8 shuffle feel which is different from the original.

Track listing
Australian 7" vinyl
"Run to Paradise" (Mark Gable, Brad Carr) – 4:08
"Struck by Lightning" (Gable, Ian Hulme, Lindsay Tebbutt) – 3:32

Australian 12" vinyl
"Run to Paradise" (Gable, Carr) – 4:08
"Struck by Lightning" (Gable, Hulme, Tebbutt) – 3:32
"One Hot Day" (Gable, Carr) – 3:28

US 7" vinyl
"Run to Paradise" (Gable, Carr) – 4:08
"Gasoline" (Gable, Carr) – 3:56

Personnel
Choirboys
Brett Williams – lead guitar
Mark Gable  – lead vocals, guitar
Ian Hulme – backing vocals, bass guitar
Lindsay Tebbutt – drums

Production details
Producer – Peter Blyton, Brian McGee, Choirboys
Engineer – Greg Henderson, McGee, Mike Duffy
Assistant engineer – Angie Cooper, Paula Jones, Mark Thomas, Kathy Nauton
Cutting engineer – Rick O'Neil
Studio – Studios 301, Rhinoceros, Festival, Glebe Studios, Alberts and Platinum Studios
Mixing studio – Rhinoceros
Cover design, inner sleeve – Studio David (David Wardle, Therese Strelein, Rebecca Strelein)
Cover photography – Sue Stubbs

Charts

Weekly charts

Nick Skitz vs. The Choirboys version

Year-end charts

References
 
General
  Note: Archived [on-line] copy has limited functionality.
 
Specific

The Choirboys (band) songs
1987 singles
1987 songs
Mushroom Records singles